Mashelabbad (ماشل آباد, also Romanized as Mashelabbad; also known as Māshelabbad) is a village in Langarud Rural District, abbasabbad District, Abbasabad County, Mazandaran Province, Iran. At the 2006 census, its population was 600, in 154 families.

References 

Populated places in Abbasabad County